

L

References